Chick Corea (1941–2021) was an American jazz pianist and composer born on June 12, 1941, in Chelsea, Massachusetts. Chick started learning piano at age four. He recorded his first album in 1966 with Tones For Joan's Bones. Corea performed with Blue Mitchell, Willie Bobo, Cal Tjader, and Herbie Mann in the mid-1960s. In the late 1960s, he performed with Stan Getz and Miles Davis. He became a
role model for many young jazz pianists of the 1970s.  He is often ranked with Herbie Hancock and Keith Jarrett as one of the most important pianists to appear after Bill Evans and McCoy Tyner, and he composed such prominent jazz standards as "Spain", "La Fiesta", and "Windows".

Albums

Studio albums

Live albums

Compilations 
 Inner Space (Atlantic, 1973) – contains all previously published and two unreleased tracks from Tones for Joan's Bones recorded in 1966 & 1968
 Chick Corea/Herbie Hancock/Keith Jarret/McCoy Tyner (Atlantic, 1976)
 Chick Corea Compact Jazz (Polydor, 1987)
 Best of Chick Corea (Blue Note, 1993)
 Music Forever & Beyond: The Selected Works of Chick Corea 1964 - 1996 (GRP, 1996) – discs 1-4 are a career-spanning retrospective; disc 5 is all-new recordings of standards, and one original, with the Time Warp quartet
 Selected Recordings (ECM, 2002)
 The Complete "Is" Sessions (Blue Note, 2002) – combined the albums Is and Sundance with alternate takes 
 Very Best of Chick Corea (Universal, 2004)
 The Song Is You (Douglas, 2005)[2CD] – combined version of Woodstock Jazz Festival 1 and Woodstock Jazz Festival 2 (Douglas Music, 1997)
 Five Trios (Stretch, 2007)[6CD]

 Electric Chick (Verve, 2008)

As group leader 
Circle
With Anthony Braxton, Dave Holland and Barry Altschul
 Circle 1: Live in Germany Concert (CBS/Sony, 1970)
 Circle 2: Gathering (CBS/Sony, 1971)
 Paris Concert (ECM, 1972) – recorded in 1971
 Circling In (Blue Note, 1975) – recorded in 1970
 Circulus  (Blue Note, 1978) – recorded in 1970

Return to Forever
 1972: Return To Forever (ECM, 1972) – as Chick Corea's album
 1972: Light as a Feather (Polydor, 1973)
 1973: Jazz Workshop Boston, MA, May 15, 1973 (Jazz-A-Nova, 2019) – live
 1973: Hymn of the Seventh Galaxy (Polydor, 1973)
 1974: Where Have I Known You Before (Polydor, 1974)
 1975: No Mystery (Polydor, 1975)
 1976: Romantic Warrior (Columbia, 1976)
 1977: Musicmagic (Columbia, 1977)
 1977: Live (Columbia, 1977)[4LP] – live
 2008: Returns (Eagle, 2009)[2CD][DVD-Video] – live
 2009: Forever (Concord, 2011)[2CD] – as Chick Corea, Stanley Clarke and Lenny White's album
 2011: The Mothership Returns (Eagle, 2012)[2CD + DVD-Video] – live
Posthumous release
 Live in Japan 1983 (Hi Hat, 2021) – live recorded in 1983
 Alive In America (Renaissance, 2022) – live recorded in 1974

As sideman 

With Stanley Clarke
 Children of Forever (Polydor, 1973)
 Journey to Love (Nemperor, 1975)
 Rocks, Pebbles and Sand (Epic, 1980)
 Up (Mack Avenue, 2014)

With Miles Davis
 Water Babies (Columbia, 1976) - recorded in1967–68
 Filles de Kilimanjaro (Columbia, 1968)
 In a Silent Way (Columbia, 1969)
 Bitches Brew (Columbia, 1970)
 Miles Davis at Fillmore: Live at the Fillmore East (Columbia, 1970)
 Jack Johnson (Columbia, 1971) – a.k.a. A Tribute to Jack Johnson
 Live-Evil (Columbia, 1971)
 On the Corner (Columbia, 1972)
 Big Fun (Columbia, 1974) - compilation recorded in 1969-72
 Black Beauty: Live at the Fillmore West (Columbia, 1977) - recorded in 1970
 Circle in the Round (Columbia, 1979) - compilation recorded in 1955-70
 1969 Miles Festiva De Juan Pins (CBS/Sony, 1993) - recorded in 1969
 Live in Europe 1969: The Bootleg Series Vol. 2 (Columbia Legacy, 2013) - recorded in 1969
 Bitches Brew Live (Sony, 2011) - live recorded in 1969-70
 Miles at the Fillmore - Miles Davis 1970: The Bootleg Series Vol. 3 (Columbia Legacy, 2014)[4CD] - recorded in 1970

With Richard Davis
 The Philosophy of the Spiritual (Cobblestone, 1971)
 With Understanding (Muse, 1975)

With Joe Farrell
 Joe Farrell Quartet (CTI, 1970)
 Outback (CTI, 1971)
 Skate Board Park (Xanadu, 1979)

With Stan Getz
 Sweet Rain (Verve, 1967)
 What the World Needs Now: Stan Getz Plays Burt Bacharach and Hal David (Verve, 1968)
 Captain Marvel (Verve, 1972)

With Joe Henderson
 Mirror Mirror (MPS, 1980)
 Relaxin' at Camarillo (Contemporary, 1981) – recorded in 1979
 Big Band (Verve, 1996)

With Eric Kloss
 To Hear Is to See! (Prestige, 1969)
 Consciousness! (Prestige, 1970)

With Hubert Laws
 The Laws of Jazz (Atlantic, 1964)
 Flute By-Laws (Atlantic, 1966)
 Laws' Cause (Atlantic, 1968)
 Wild Flower (Atlantic, 1972)
 Family (Columbia, 1980)
 Blanchard: New Earth Sonata (Columbia Masterworks, 1985)

With Herbie Mann
 Herbie Mann Plays The Roar of the Greasepaint – The Smell of the Crowd (Atlantic, 1965)
 Monday Night at the Village Gate (Atlantic, 1966) - recorded in 1965
 Latin Mann (Columbia, 1965)
 Standing Ovation at Newport (Atlantic, 1965)

With Al di Meola
 Land of the Midnight Sun (Columbia, 1976)
 Splendido Hotel (Columbia, 1980) – recorded in 1979
 Consequence of Chaos (Telarc, 2006)

With Blue Mitchell
 The Thing to Do (Blue Note, 1964)
 Down with It! (Blue Note, 1965)
 Boss Horn (Blue Note, 1966)

With John Patitucci
 John Patitucci (GRP, 1987)
 On The Corner (GRP, 1989)
 Heart of the Bass (Stretch, 1992)

With Wayne Shorter
 Super Nova (Blue Note, 1969)
 Moto Grosso Feio (Blue Note, 1974) – recorded in 1970

With Cal Tjader
Soul Burst (Verve, 1966)
Along Comes Cal (Verve, 1967)

With Allen Vizzutti
 In The Pocket (Headfirst, 1981)
 Skyrocket (Summit Records, 1995)

With others
 Dee Dee Bridgewater, Just Family (Elektra, 1977)
 Gary Burton, Like Minds (Concord, 1998) – Grammy won album. recorded in 1997.
 Marion Brown, Afternoon of a Georgia Faun (ECM, 1970)
 Anthony Braxton, The Complete Braxton (Freedom, 1973)
 Donald Byrd, The Creeper (Blue Note, 1981) - recorded in 1967
 Ron Carter, Parade (Milestone, 1980) – recorded in 1979
 Larry Coryell, Spaces (Vanguard, 1970)
 Eliane Elias, Mirror Mirror (Candid, 2021)
 David Friesen, Amber Skies (Palo Alto, 1983)
 Letizia Gambi,  Introducing Letizia Gambi (Jando Music / Via Veneto Jazz, 2012)
 Eddie Gómez, Gomez (Interface, 1984)
 Herbie Hancock, Gershwin's World (Verve, 1998)
 L. Ron Hubbard & Friends, The Road to Freedom (Revenimus Music, 1986)
 Bobby Hutcherson, Total Eclipse (Blue Note. 1969)
 Elvin Jones, Merry-Go-Round (Blue Note. 1971)
 Chaka Khan, Echoes of an Era (Elektra, 1982)
 Rolf Kühn, Going to the Rainbow (BASF, 1971)
 Paco de Lucia, Zyriab (Polygram, 1990)
 The Manhattan Transfer, The Chick Corea Songbook (Four Quarters Entertainment, 2009)
 Tete Montoliu, Lunch in L.A. (Contemporary, 1980)
 Airto Moreira, Free (CTI, 1972)
 Philharmonia Virtuosi of New York, Greatest Hits of 1790 (Columbia Masterworks, 1980)
 Armando Peraza, Wild Thing (Skye, 1968)
 Dave Pike, Manhattan Latin (Decca, 1964)
 Pete La Roca, Turkish Women at the Bath (Douglas, 1967) – reissued under Corea's name as Bliss (Muse, 1973)
 Wallace Roney, Village (Warner Bros., 1997) – recorded in 1996
 Antonio Sánchez, Migration (CAM Jazz, 2007)
 Mongo Santamaria, Skins (Milestone, 1962)
 Sonny Stitt, Stitt Goes Latin (Roost, 1963)
 John Surman, Conflagration (Dawn, 1971)
 Gábor Szabó, Femme Fatale (Pepita, 1979)
 Miroslav Vitous, Universal Syncopations (ECM, 2003)
 Mark Weinstein, Cuban Roots (Musicor, 1967)
 Sadao Watanabe, Round Trip (CBS/Sony, 1970)

References 

 
Jazz discographies
Discographies of American artists